Stratified columnar epithelium is a rare type of epithelial tissue composed of column-shaped cells arranged in multiple layers. It is found in the conjunctiva, pharynx, anus, and male urethra. It also occurs in embryo.

Location 
Stratified columnar epithelia are found in a variety of locations, including:

 parts of the conjunctiva of the eye
 parts of the pharynx
 anus
 male urethra and vas deferens
 excretory duct of mammary gland and major salivary glands

Embryology 
Stratified columnar epithelium is initially present in parts of the gastrointestinal tract in utero, before being replaced with other types of epithelium. For example, by 8 weeks, it covers the lining of the stomach. By 17 weeks, it is replaced by simple columnar epithelium. This is also found in the fetal esophagus.

Function 
The cells function in secretion and protection.

See also 
 Pseudostratified columnar epithelium

References

External links
  – "Stratified Columnar Epithelium"

Epithelium